In Cook Islands mythology, Vaitakere is the father-in-law of Tangaroa. He discovered breadfruit in the mountains and his wife discovered the chestnut.

See also
 Polynesian mythology

References

Cook Islands mythology
Origin myths